is a train station in Teshikaga, Hokkaidō, Japan.

Lines
Hokkaido Railway Company
Senmō Main Line Station B64

Adjacent stations

External links

 JR Hokkaido Mashū Station information 

Railway stations in Japan opened in 1929
Stations of Hokkaido Railway Company
Railway stations in Hokkaido Prefecture